Vosta Kola (also Romanized as Vosţá Kolā; also known as Vasaţ Kolā) is a village in Aliabad Rural District, in the Central District of Qaem Shahr County, Mazandaran Province, Iran. At the 2006 census, its population was 1,479, in 401 families.

References 

Populated places in Qaem Shahr County